The 2020 Astana Open is an ATP tournament organised for male professional tennis players, held in Nur-Sultan, Kazakhstan, at the end of October 2020 on indoor hard courts. It was primarily organised due to the cancellation of many tournaments during the 2020 season, because of the ongoing COVID-19 pandemic. It is the first edition of the tournament and it took place in Nur-Sultan, Kazakhstan, from October 26 through November 1, 2020.

Singles main draw entrants

Seeds

 Rankings are as of October 19, 2020.

Other entrants
The following players received wildcards into the singles main draw:
  Dmitry Popko
  Andreas Seppi 
  Timofey Skatov

The following player received a protected ranking into the singles main draw:
  Mackenzie McDonald

The following players received entry from the qualifying draw:
  Damir Džumhur
  Aslan Karatsev
  Emil Ruusuvuori
  Yūichi Sugita

Withdrawals
  Pablo Andújar → replaced by  Mikhail Kukushkin
  Laslo Đere → replaced by  Federico Delbonis
  Richard Gasquet → replaced by  Radu Albot
  Juan Ignacio Londero → replaced by  Egor Gerasimov
  Gilles Simon → replaced by  Mackenzie McDonald

Doubles main draw entrants

Seeds

 Rankings are as of October 19, 2020

Other entrants
The following pairs received wildcards into the doubles main draw: 
  Andrey Golubev /  Aleksandr Nedovyesov
  Mohamed Safwat /  Denis Yevseyev

The following pair received entry using a protected ranking: 
  Mackenzie McDonald /  Tommy Paul

Champions

Singles

  John Millman def.  Adrian Mannarino, 7–5, 6–1

Doubles

  Sander Gillé /  Joran Vliegen def.  Max Purcell /  Luke Saville, 7–5, 6–3

References

External links
Official website

Astana Open
Astana Open
Astana Open
Astana Open